"A White Sport Coat" is a 1957 country and western song with words and music both written by Marty Robbins. It was recorded on January 25, 1957, and released on the Columbia Records label, over a month later, on March 4. The arranger and recording session conductor was Ray Conniff, an in-house conductor/arranger at Columbia. Robbins had demanded to have Conniff oversee the recording after his earlier hit, "Singing the Blues", had been quickly eclipsed on the charts by Guy Mitchell's cover version, which was scored and conducted by Conniff in October 1956.

The song reached no. 1 on the US country chart, becoming Marty Robbins' third No. 1 record. It reached no. 2 on the Billboard pop chart, and no. 1 in the Australian music charts.

Background
Robbins recalled writing "A White Sport Coat" in approximately twenty minutes, while being transported in a standard automobile. He is said to have had the inspiration for the song while driving from a motel to a venue in Ohio, where he was due to perform that evening. During the course of the journey, he passed a local high school, where its students were dressed ready for their prom.

In the song, the narrator was hoping to go to prom with a certain girl to dance, wearing a white sport coat and a pink carnation. However, the girl decided to go to the prom with another guy, resulting in the narrator being in a blue mood.

Cover versions
 A version by Johnny Desmond received some play also, peaking at No. 62 on the U.S. pop charts.
 In UK the song was a notable hit for the English rock and roll singer Terry Dene, which reached #18 in the UK Charts. A recording by The King Brothers peaked at #6. Both of these versions hit in early summer 1957.

In popular culture
 The song is mentioned in Don McLean's song "American Pie" (1971), with just the lyric about the "Pink Carnation".
 Jimmy Buffett's 1973 album A White Sport Coat and a Pink Crustacean spoofs the title of the song.
 The song is featured in the opening credits of the 1997 film Going All the Way.
 The song can be heard during the bowling-alley scene in Martin Scorsese's 2019 film The Irishman.

References

External links
 [ AllMusic]

1957 singles
Marty Robbins songs
Number-one singles in Australia
Songs written by Marty Robbins
Columbia Records singles
Song recordings produced by Mitch Miller
1957 songs